Price's Post Office or the Price House is a house built c. 1800 in Spartanburg County, South Carolina. Its name in the USGS Geographic Names Information System is Prices Post Office. It is located at the intersection of Oak View Farm Road (South Carolina State Highway 42–200), Old Switzer Road (South Carolina State Highway 42–199), and Price House Road (South Carolina State Highway 42–86). It was named to the National Register of Historic Places on October 28, 1969.

History

Thomas Price moved to the Spartanburg District around 1793. He was a landowner and entrepreneur. He operated a general store and post office next to his house. The post office was operated from about 1811 to 1820. The house was on the Spartanburg stagecoach line to Cross Anchor, South Carolina. He operated a "publick house" or tavern and stagecoach stop.

When his wife, Anne, died in 1821, she left a forty-two page inventory of the estate. In addition to the house furnishings, the inventory included 25 slaves and agricultural machinery. Going beyond "frontier-level," the furnishings included a curtained four poster bed, an 8-day clock, a desk, and a bookcase, and volumes of the Spectator, the Tatler and other publications. The farm equipment included grindstones, a loom, a spinning wheel, a cotton picking machine, and riding chaise.

Just after the Civil War, the house came into the hands of Captain George Bobo Dean and, according to Landrum's History of Spartanburg County it was his primary residence until he was elected Sheriff of Spartanburg and moved into town. In the Will of George B. Dean, the house (called "My Prince Place") was given to his eldest son, James Madison Dean. It remained in the Dean family until about 1936 when it was bought by the Spartanburg County Historical Association.

It is a now historic house museum operated by the Spartanburg County Historical Association. It is open on Sunday afternoons throughout the year, on Saturdays in the summer, and by reservations.

Architecture

The house is a -story, brick house with a gambrel roof. At that time, a gambrel roof was unusual in upstate South Carolina.

The rooms are paneled with wood on the walls and ceilings. The first floor has a parlor, called the Pine Room because of its wood paneling, and a large dining room for both the family and stagecoach riders. These two rooms are separated by a central hallway that extends through each story. The second floor has one small and two large bedrooms. The top floor under the eaves has one bedroom for male travelers and one for female travelers.

An extension was built to the rear around 1820. The extension was probably built as quarters for the servants. It is constructed of English bond, and is now a kitchen.

References

External links
 
 Historic Price House - Spartanburg County Historical Association

Historic American Buildings Survey in South Carolina
Houses on the National Register of Historic Places in South Carolina
Post office buildings on the National Register of Historic Places in South Carolina
Houses completed in 1800
Historic house museums in South Carolina
Museums in Spartanburg County, South Carolina
National Register of Historic Places in Spartanburg County, South Carolina
Houses in Spartanburg County, South Carolina